The Bombing of Albanian refugees near Gjakova occurred on 14 April 1999 during the NATO bombing of Yugoslavia, when NATO planes bombed refugees on a twelve-mile stretch of road between the towns of Gjakova (Đakovica) and Deçan (Dečani) in western Kosovo and Metohija, FR Yugoslavia (now Kosovo) 73 Kosovo Albanian civilians were killed. Among the victims were 16 children.

NATO response

NATO and the United States initially claimed that the target was exclusively a military convoy and that Yugoslav forces may have been responsible for any attacks on civilians, stating "after the convoy was hit, military people got out and attacked civilians." However, two days later, NATO acknowledged that its aircraft had bombed civilian vehicles, claiming this to be by mistake. Reporters from the American media went to the scene that same day and interviewed survivors and saw damaged farm tractors, burned bodies identified as refugees, bomb craters and shrapnel. Initially, NATO said its aircraft had targeted military vehicles, then reported that an American F-16 pilot had fired on what he thought to be military trucks. NATO expressed "deep regret." Tanjug reported that three Serbian policemen were also killed in the attack.

See also
Koriša bombing
Varvarin bridge bombing
Lužane bus bombing
Grdelica train bombing

Notes

References

Books

External links 
Confusion over refugee bombings (BBC)

Aerial operations and battles of the Kosovo War
NATO airstrikes
Gjakova
1999 in Kosovo
Civilian casualties in the Kosovo War
People killed during the NATO bombing of Yugoslavia
Incidents involving NATO
April 1999 events in Europe
United States war crimes